is a Japanese footballer who plays for Machida Zelvia.

Club statistics
Updated to 1 December 2022.

References

External links
Profile at Ehime FC

Profile at Cerezo Osaka

1996 births
Living people
Association football people from Tokyo
Japanese footballers
J2 League players
J3 League players
Jurato Ikeda
Cerezo Osaka players
Cerezo Osaka U-23 players
Ehime FC players
Blaublitz Akita players
AC Nagano Parceiro players
FC Machida Zelvia players
Association football defenders